Smart Parks (formerly ShadowView) is an organisation which focuses on supporting conservation and anti-poaching using modern technology.

History
ShadowView was founded in 2012 and launched publicly in January 2013. The organisation operates as a registered charity in the UK and a Stichting or Private foundation in the Netherlands. On 4 July 2013 ShadowView announced that it had received charitable status in the Netherlands and was formally named ShadowView Foundation. ShadowView's stated mission is to provide cost effective UAV solutions to non profits and civilian operations. In collaboration with League Against Cruel Sports, ShadowView claim to be the first organisation to use UAV's to monitor and document potential wildlife crime in England.

ShadowView was founded to address the need to support conservation organisations in their battles to protect the natural environment. ShadowView provides aerial surveillance and monitoring through the use of unmanned aerial vehicles (UAV), used primarily in Wildlife conservation (working with non-profits and NGO's to monitor disaster relief situations, poaching and wildlife crime, habitat destruction, biomass management and general conservation efforts)

Supporters to the ShadowView Foundation include Rob Thielen who is chairman and founder of Waterland Private Equity Investments based in the Netherlands, and co-founding partner of Elbrus Capital, a Russia based private equity group.

Smart Parks was formed by the merger of two charities ShadowView and Internet of Life in 2017. The organisation operates as a registered charity in the UK and a Stichting with a Social Enterprise model limited company in the Netherlands. 
The mission of Smart Parks is to utilise technology to assist in anti-poaching and park management across the world. The primary operational focus is to create a network of sensors and technologies that allows permanent live monitoring of assets in the park that is being protected. 
In 2017 Rwanda’s Akagera National Park launched the Smart Parks technology which allows park rangers to monitor animals, visitors, and equipment in real-time. The Smart Parks system is based on the LoRa technology a Long Range Wide-Area Network (LoRaWAN) with low-bandwidth, low-power networking technology that can blanket large areas at relatively low costs.

Operations
In November 2013 ShadowView confirmed deployment of their Eco Ranger, Shadow Ranger and Shadow Rotor UAS in the Greater Kruger area for anti poaching operations.

ShadowView continued to operate throughout 2014 in a variety of private reserves in South Africa. In January 2017 The Internet of Life and the ShadowView Foundation organisations co-developed a LoRa-equipped sensor that is implanted directly into the rhino’s horn. The sensor gives park rangers the ability to accurately monitor the whereabouts and activities of the endangered black rhinos and keep them safe from poachers. The LoRa-equipped tracking sensor is part of a comprehensive LoRaWAN™-based IoT security solution that is deployed throughout Mkomazi National Park.

In January 2017 The Internet of Life and the ShadowView Foundation organisations co-developed a LoRa-equipped sensor that is implanted directly into a rhinoceros horn for protection against poaching in Akagera National Park. The sensor has given park rangers the ability to accurately monitor the whereabouts and activities of the critically endangered black rhinos and keep them safe from wildlife criminals and poachers. The LoRa-equipped tracking sensor is part of a comprehensive LoRaWAN™-based IoT security solution utilised by Smart Parks that is now being deployed throughout Mkomazi National Park and many other locations.

Smart Parks has installed its fourth and largest African smart park to date in Malawi's Liwonde National Park in October 2018.
In just two weeks, the 548km2 national park was equipped with gateways and sensors that gather information to help improve park management and protection. The construction of the network in the Liwonde National Park was implemented alongside a team from African Parks, a conservation NGO that manages the park on behalf of the Malawian government. The group was trained by Smart Parks for the construction of the site.

Smart Parks announced in 2018 an operation in the Serengeti National Park, a World Heritage Site.

Controversy
There has been some controversy in the media surrounding the use of UAV or "drones" in the countryside of the UK with the Countryside Alliance suggesting the use of drones might be dangerous to people and animals ShadowView respond to the controversy of using drones, saying they fly within CAA flight regulations for missions across the UK.
In December 2013 International NGO 'Free the Slaves' announced it would partner with ShadowView and use UAV to identify illegal slavery, the reception in India was mixed with some of the public supporting the concept and some voicing concern of the use of drones.

Partners
Smart Parks partners with African Parks, WWF, Save the Children, Semtech and many technology partners and have won the following awards:
Human Wildlife Conflict Challenge through WWF and WildLabs 
Tech for Global Good Laureate 2018

References

External links 
 ShadowView Website

Charities based in the Netherlands
Charities based in England
Nature conservation
Environmentalism in the Netherlands
Environmental organisations based in the United Kingdom